ESOMAR is a membership organization for market, social, and opinion researchers that was founded in 1947.  The name ESOMAR is an abbreviation of their original name, the European Society for Opinion and Marketing Research, which reflects the original catchment of the organisation.  ESOMAR has published an ethics and guidance code for its members since 1948, with a joint code being published with the International Chamber of Commerce (ICC) since 1977.

History
ESOMAR was founded in 1947.  In 1948 the first version of code of practice for members was published.  In 1976 ESOMAR and the ICC determined a single code of practice would be preferable and the first joint code of practice was published in 1977, with revisions in 1986, 1994 and 2007.   From the revision in 2016 the title and content was changed to include data analytics.

Activities
ESOMAR produces information about market research. 
ESOMAR produces the Research World magazine bi-monthly, with publisher Wiley Online Library claiming a worldwide circulation of close to 20,000 with the majority of the readers in Europe.

Notes, references and sources

Notes

References

Further reading

External links
 

Professional associations based in the Netherlands
Pan-European trade and professional organizations
Market research organizations